Jana propinquestria is a moth in the  family Eupterotidae. It was described by Strand in 1911. It is found in Cameroon.

References

Moths described in 1911
Janinae